Gordon North Sydney Hockey Club, often called GNS, is a hockey club based on the North Shore of Sydney, Australia. It is currently a member of the Northern Sydney and Beaches Hockey Association

The men's team has featured many Australian representatives over the years, including Kookaburras Brent Livermore, Jamie Dwyer, Matthew Butturini and Mark Knowles. Whereas the women's teams include Hockeyroos Murphy Allendorf, Grace Jeffery and Anna Flanagan.

In 2020 GNS's men's portion of the club combined with Manly Hockey Club's men's department to better meet the Sydney Hockey Association's New Premier League structure to play in the PL1, PL2 and PL3 competitions, run by SHA.

History 
Today's Gordon North Sydney Hockey Club is a result of many past mergers, occurring over the past century.

North Sydney District Hockey Club was a dominant Men's hockey club in Sydney throughout the 1970s and 1980s, having all 7 men's team playing in the Grand Finals in 1979. It itself was a merger of North Sydney Police Boys Club and Cremorne-North Sydney Hockey Club in 1953, and later including Mosman Hockey Club in 1959–60.

Gordon Hockey Club is believed to have been founded in the 1920s, also as a merger, and played under the banner of Gordon-Wahroongah Hockey Club from 1952 until 1991, when it became incorporated.

In 1991 Gordon North Sydney Hockey Club emerged from the merger of North Sydney District Hockey Club and Gordon Hockey Club, as North Sydney wasn't getting appraisal or help from the local council towards a future commitment to club infrastructure, like a potential artificial turf field. It also saw declining player numbers. In contrast, Gordon had the newly built Ku-ring-gai Hockey Centre and increasing player numbers, but had yet to crack the top men's and women's grades. The merger provided a top men's team for both prior teams.

Success and Performance 
Gordon North Sydney Hockey Club and their respective mergers have had a host of success since their inception(s), across a variety of awards:

 Gordon North Sydney HC's 1st Grade Women side winning the 2018 1st Grade Premiership (1st Title)
 North Sydney District Hockey Club winning the 1st Grade Premiership in 1979, and Mosman Hockey Club in both 1929 and 1932
 North Sydney District HC winning the 2nd Grade Premierships (Pilgrim Trophy) in 1984, 1982, 1980, 1977–78, 1975, and Mosman HC in 1938
 North Sydney District HC winning the 3rd Grade Premierships (JW Taylor Trophy) in 1984 and 1977, and Cremorne-North Sydney HC in 1952
 North Sydney District HC winning the 4th Grade Premiership (Ron Willington Trophy) in 1985
 Gordon North Sydney HC winning the 5th Grade Mens Premiership (Sydney League 1) in 2011, Gordon HC in 1995-96 and North Sydney District HC in 1986 and 1984
 Gordon North Sydney HC winning the 6th Grade Mens Premierships (Sydney League 2) in 2012 and 2001, and Gordon HC in 1995
 Gordon North Sydney HC winning the 7th Grade Mens Premierships (Sydney League 3/JA Pearce Cup) in 2006-07
 Gordon North Sydney HC winning the 9th Grade Mens Premierships (Sydney League 5/R Skone Trophy) in 2010–11, and North Sydney District HC in 1987-88
 North Sydney District HC winning the PL1&2 Club Premierships in 1984-85 and 1979 (Co-inciding with the 1st Grade Premiership)
 Gordon North Sydney HC winning the PL3&4 Club Premiership in 2001
 North Sydney District HC winning the SL1&2 Club Premierships in 1987-88 and 1966, Gordon-Wahroongah HC in 1967, and Gordon North Sydney HC in 2012
 Gordon HC winning the SL3&4 Club Premiership in 1981, and Gordon-Wahroongah HC in 1980

References

External links
 GNS Hockey official website

Australian field hockey clubs
Sporting clubs in Sydney
North Sydney, New South Wales